John Dawnay may refer to:

Sir John Dawnay (14th century), English soldier
John Dawnay, 1st Viscount Downe (1625–1695), MP for Pontefract and Yorkshire
John Dawnay (MP) (1686–1740), MP for Pontefract, grandson of the above
John Dawnay, 4th Viscount Downe (1728–1780), MP for Cirencester and Malton, son of the above
John Dawnay, 5th Viscount Downe (1764–1832), MP for Petersfield and Wootton Basset, son of the above
John Dawnay, 9th Viscount Downe (1872–1931), Viscount Downe
John Dawnay, 11th Viscount Downe (1935–2002), Viscount Downe

See also
Dawnay (surname)